Idiommata is a genus of brushed trapdoor spiders first described by Anton Ausserer in 1871.

Species
 it contains four species:
Idiommata blackwalli (O. Pickard-Cambridge, 1870) — Australia (Western Australia)
Idiommata fusca L. Koch, 1874 — Australia (Queensland)
Idiommata iridescens (Rainbow & Pulleine, 1918) — Australia (Queensland)
Idiommata scintillans (Rainbow & Pulleine, 1918) — Australia (South Australia)

References

External links

Barychelidae
Mygalomorphae genera
Taxa named by Anton Ausserer